HMS Tristram was a modified Admiralty  destroyer that served in the Royal Navy during the First World War. The Modified R class added attributes of the Yarrow Later M class to improve the capability of the ships to operate in bad weather. Launched in 1917, the destroyer was operational for just over four years. In 1917, Tristram joined the Grand Fleet and provided distant cover at the Second Battle of Heligoland Bight but did not engage with the enemy. After the armistice which ended the war, the destroyer was initially transferred to the Home Fleet before being placed in reserve in 1920 and then sold to be broken up in 1921.

Design and development

Tristram was one of eleven Modified  destroyers ordered by the British Admiralty in March 1916 as part of the Eighth War Construction Programme. The design was a development of the existing R class, adding features from the Yarrow Later M class which had been introduced based on wartime experience. The forward two boilers were transposed and vented through a single funnel, enabling the bridge and forward gun to be placed further aft. Combined with hull-strengthening, this improved the destroyers' ability to operate at high speed in bad weather.

Two funnels were fitted.

Armament consisted of three single QF  Mk V guns on the ship's centreline, with one on the forecastle, one aft on a raised platform and one between the funnels. A single 2-pounder  "pom-pom anti-aircraft gun was carried on a platform between two twin mounts for  torpedoes. The ship had a complement of 82 officers and ratings.

Construction and career
Tristram was laid down by J. Samuel White at East Cowes on the Isle of Wight on 23 September 1916 with the yard number 1482, and launched on 24 February the following year. The vessel was completed on 30 June. The ship was the first to be named after Tristam, a legendary knight and follower of King Arthur.

On commissioning, Tristram joined the Thirteenth Destroyer Flotilla of the Grand Fleet. The flotilla took part in the Royal Navy's engagement with one of the final sorties of the German High Seas Fleet during the First World War, on 24 April 1918, although the two fleets did not actually meet and the destroyer was unharmed. The vessel remained with the Thirteenth Flotilla until 1919.

As the Royal Navy returned to a peacetime level of strength after the armistice, both the number of ships and the amount of personnel needed to be reduced to save money. In 1923, the Navy decided to retire many of the older destroyers in preparation for the introduction of newer and larger vessels. The ship was sold to Thos W Ward of Briton Ferry on 9 May 1921 and breaking up started on 29 August 1924.

Pennant numbers

References

Citations

Bibliography

 
 
 
 
 
 
 
 
 
 
 

 

1917 ships
R-class destroyers (1916)
Ships built on the Isle of Wight
World War I destroyers of the United Kingdom